C. indicus may refer to:
 Cajanus indicus, the pigeon pea, a perennial member of the family Fabaceae
Calidifontibacter indicus, a species of spring water bacterium
 Caprimulgus indicus, the Indian jungle nightjar, a species of nightjar found in India and Sri Lanka
Celeribacter indicus, a species of deep-sea bacterium
Cephalodiscus indicus, a species of sessile hemichordate
 Chadefaudiomyces indicus, a species of fungi in the family Valsaceae
Chlaenius indicus, a species of ground beetle
Clyzomedus indicus, a species of longhorn beetle
 Cocculus indicus, the fruit of Anamirta cocculus, a source of picrotoxin, a poisonous alkaloid with stimulant properties
Copelatus indicus, a species of diving beetle
 Cynosurus indicus, a grass species in the genus Cynosurus

Synonyms 
 Cottus indicus, a synonym of Aspidophoroides monopterygius

See also
 Indicus (disambiguation)